Gary Brian Denbo (born December 9, 1960) is a former American baseball front office executive. He was the director of player development and scouting for the Miami Marlins of Major League Baseball (MLB). Previously, he served as a hitting coach for the New York Yankees and Toronto Blue Jays of MLB and for the Hokkaido Nippon-Ham Fighters of Nippon Professional Baseball. He has also worked in the Yankees' front office.

Playing career
Denbo attended Princeton Community High School in Princeton, Indiana, and Oakland City University in Oakland City, Indiana. He was drafted as an infielder by the Cincinnati Reds in the 17th round of the 1983 Major League Baseball draft. Denbo played in Minor League Baseball for four years.

Post-playing career

After retiring as a player, Denbo became a minor league coach and manager.  Denbo took his first coaching position in 1986 as a Player-coach for the Cincinnati Reds Double-A club in Vermont.  He remained with the Reds organization through 1989.

In 1990, Denbo joined the Yankees organization.  He served as a hitting coach and manager for minor league teams in the Yankees organization through 1996.  In 1997, he took over as the hitting coordinator for the entire Yankees organization, and in 2000 was also the Assistant Minor League Director.

In 2001, Denbo was the major league hitting coach for the New York Yankees. He also served as the hitting coach for the American League All-star team in the 2001 All-star game in Seattle.

Denbo was a scout for the Cleveland Indians in 2002. He was a hitting coach for the Hokkaido Nippon-Ham Fighters of the Pacific League in Nippon Professional Baseball from 2003 through 2005. He rejoined the Yankees organization in 2006 as the organization's hitting coordinator.

In 2008, he became the hitting coach for the Toronto Blue Jays.

In 2009, Denbo returned to the Yankees as a player development consultant, and continues in his current position in scouting and player development. While in a slump during the 2011 season, Derek Jeter worked on his swing with Denbo, which Jeter attributed to his improvement later in the season.

In June 2014, Denbo was named hitting consultant for the 2014 USA Baseball Collegiate National Team.

In October 2014 the Yankees named Denbo Vice President of Player Development. Denbo began the "Captain's Camp", an opportunity for the team's best prospects to interact with former players.

In October 2017, Denbo was named the Vice President of Scouting and Player Development for the Miami Marlins. The Marlins fired Denbo in June 2022, months after Jeter had divested from the team's ownership group.

See also
List of New York Yankees coaches

References

External links

Report: Gary Denbo Replaces Mark Newman, Pat Roessler Out Retrieved from SI.com on 2014-10-20
Age-old questions for Yankees captain Jeter Retrieved from New York Post.com on 2012-2-24
Work with Denbo helped Jeter find swing Retrieved from mlb.com on 2011-8-22
Denbo Articles Retrieved from nydailynews.com on 2010-5-3
Blue Jays Press Release/Denbo to Stress Unselfish Hitting Style  Retrieved on 2007-10-12
The Wisdom of Mike Lowell Retrieved from globeandmail.com on 2007-10-11
Denbo says Soriano developing plate discipline Retrieved from cnnsi.com on 2001-5-18

1960 births
Living people
American expatriate baseball people in Canada
American expatriate baseball people in Japan
Baseball coaches from Indiana
Billings Mustangs players
Cedar Rapids Reds players
Cleveland Indians scouts
Major League Baseball hitting coaches
Minor league baseball managers
New York Yankees coaches
New York Yankees scouts
People from Princeton, Indiana
Toronto Blue Jays coaches
Vermont Reds players
Oakland City University alumni